Brenda Longfellow (born 1954) is a Canadian filmmaker known for her biographies of female historic figures.  Since 2007, Longfellow's focus in her films has been on environmental issues.

Biography 
Brenda Longfellow was born in Copper Cliff, Ontario in 1954. Longfellow earned  MA at Carleton University and completed a PhD at York University.

Career 
Longfellow is a Canadian filmmaker and Professor of Cinema & Media Studies in the York University Film Department. She is a film theorist and has published multiple articles related to Canadian cinema, documentary and feminist film theory.

Style, technique, and reception 
Longfellow's stated the following on the Canadian Women Film Directors Database website about her biographies about women,  "...using biography as a way to think through as deeply as possible the contradictions that women live with.  I've often chosen subjects where there has been dissonance between the public image of the women and her private experience".

Significant works 

Offshore (2018), an interactive web documentary received AMPD Research Award from York University.
Dead Ducks (2011), received the Audience Award for Best Experimental Film at the Santa Cruz Film Festival.
Carpe Diem (2010), a short opera about environmental disaster.
Weather Report (2008), a TV documentary exploring climate change received a Bronze Remi Award at the Houston Film Festival.
Tina in Mexico (2002), a feature documentary about Tina Mondott received Best Arts/Cultural Documentary at International Festival of New Latin American Cinema, Havana, Cuba.
Shadow Maker: Gwendolyn MacEwen, Poet (1998) won a Canadian Screen Award for Best Short Documentary at the 19th Genie Awards.
Our Marilyn (1987), an experimental 16 mm film about Marilyn Bell received the Grand Prix at Oberhausen and was purchased by the National Gallery of Canada in 1990.

Bibliography
 MacKenzie, Scott; Waugh, Tom; Brenda Longfellow (2013) co-editors. The Perils of Pedagogy: The Works of John Greyson anthology. 
 Pevere, Geoff; Handling, Piers; Hays, Matthew; Wise, Wyndham; Longfellow, Brenda; Gravestock, Steve; Edwards, Justin D. (2009). Toronto on Film. Wilfrid Laurier University Press. .
 Armatage, Kay; Banning, Kass, Longfellow, Brenda; Marchessault, Janine (1992). Gendering the Nation: Canadian Women's Cinema (pp. 3–14) University of Toronto Press.

References

Further reading 
 Szeman, Imre (2015). Art Against Oil: Brenda Longellow's "Offshore" . Point of View Magazine.
 Korber, Lill-Ann; MacKenzie, Scott; Stenport, Anna Esterstahl, co-editors(2017). Arctic Environmental Modernities: From the Age of Polar Exploration to the Era of the Anthropocene. The Melodrama of Hyper-Reality: Brenda Longfellow's Dead Ducks (2012) pp 189–191,  Palgrave Studies in World Environmental History.

External links 
 

1954 births
Living people
20th-century Canadian women artists
21st-century Canadian women artists
Canadian documentary film directors
Canadian experimental filmmakers
Canadian women film directors
Feminist filmmakers
Canadian women documentary filmmakers